Myristica petiolata is a species of plant in the family Myristicaceae. It is endemic to the Solomon Islands.

References

Flora of the Solomon Islands (archipelago)
petiolata
Vulnerable plants
Endemic flora of the Solomon Islands
Taxonomy articles created by Polbot